Antanas Krištopaitis  (born 21 May 1921 Valdomai, Šiauliai district; died 6 May 2011 Šiauliai) is a Lithuanian painter, ethnographer and social activist. He has painted over 600 paintings of churches in Lithuania and over 200 paintings of windmills.

References

1921 births
2011 deaths
People from Šiauliai District Municipality
Lithuanian painters
Soviet painters